Ji Mantriji (literally "Yes Minister" in Hindi) is an Indian adaptation of the British satirical sitcom Yes Minister. It was telecast from 26 April 2001 on STAR Plus with permission from the BBC. Ji Mantriji features Farooq Sheikh as Surya Prakash Singh, the Minister of Administrative Affairs; and Jayant Kripalani as the department's secretary. The plot lines were the same as those of the original, with suitable changes in the Indian context. Ji Mantriji was produced by NDTV in collaboration with BBC Worldwide. The opening titles for each episode were illustrated by famous Indian cartoonist, R. K. Laxman, well known for his political cartoon series, The Common Man.

Ji Mantriji was in production for a year before being aired, which is unusual in Indian television where serials are generally developed and produced a few weeks in advance. The writers changed certain references to fit the new setting: France was changed to Pakistan and the European Economic Community was changed to the SAARC and the Commonwealth. A sequel, Ji Pradhanmantriji (Yes Prime Minister) was also produced. The books accompanying the series were published in India by Penguin Books.

Cast
Farooq Sheikh as Surya Prakash Singh
Jayant Kripalani as Rajnath Mathur

Awards
Hero Honda ITA Award for Best Serial Comedy
Hero Honda ITA Award for Best Actor in a Comedy - Farooq Sheikh

References

StarPlus original programming
Indian political television series
Indian comedy television series
2001 Indian television series debuts
2001 Indian television series endings
Indian television series based on British television series